The Olympus Zuiko Digital 300mm 1:2.8 is an interchangeable camera lens announced by Olympus Corporation on June 24, 2003. As the largest and heaviest lens in the Zuiko Digital line, the ZD300mm f/2.8 was given the nickname "Big Tuna".

References

External links
 

300mm f 2.8
Camera lenses introduced in 2003